Konar-e Naru (also Romanized as Konār-e Narū; also known as Konān Derow, Konānrow, and Konār-e Rū) is a village in Baghak Rural District, in the Central District of Tangestan County, Bushehr Province, Iran. At the 2006 census, its population was 113, in 25 families.

References 

Populated places in Tangestan County